Dennis Galabuzi Ssozi also Dennis Galabuzi Ssozi, is a Ugandan civil engineer, politician and businessman. He is the State Minister for Luweero Triangle in the Ugandan Cabinet. He was appointed to that position on 6 June 2016, replacing Sarah Kataike, who was dropped from cabinet. Galabuzi Ssozi also serves as the elected member of parliament, representing Busiro North Constituency, in Wakiso District, in the 10th Parliament of Uganda (2016–2021).

Background and education
He was born in Masulita, Busiro county, Wakiso District, in the Central Region of Uganda, circa 1975. He is a qualified civil engineer with a Bachelor of Science in Civil Engineering and a Master of Science in Civil Engineering.

Career
On 6 June 2016, he was appointed State Minister for Luweero Triangle. Prior to that he worked in the Ugandan Water Ministry, before going into private business. At the time of his appointment, in addition to his parliamentary duties, he served as the Vice President of the Uganda Olympic Committee.

See also
 Cabinet of Uganda
 Parliament of Uganda

References

External links
 Website of Parliament of Uganda

Living people
1975 births
Ganda people
People from Wakiso District
Ugandan civil engineers
National Resistance Movement politicians
Members of the Parliament of Uganda
Government ministers of Uganda
Makerere University alumni
21st-century Ugandan politicians